Felix Hell (born 14 September 1985) is a German organist.

Childhood
Born in Frankenthal, Rhineland-Palatinate, Hell was a child prodigy, performing his first organ recital in Russia at the age of nine, and presenting concerts on the organ in many countries around the world before his 11th birthday. Beginning piano lessons at the age of seven, inspired by Bach's C-Major Prelude, his remarkable ability was quickly apparent. It was only eight months later he decided to undertake organ lessons.

On Easter, during the year he was eight years old, he was on duty in his first service as a liturgical organist, playing the organ at a Roman Catholic High Mass. He has concertized extensively ever since.

Competitions

1994
"Jugend musiziert" (Federal German competition for young musicians)
Two first prizes in organ playing

1996
"Jugend musiziert"
Two first prizes in piano playing

1997
"Jugend musiziert"
Two first prizes in organ playing

1999
"Jugend musiziert"
Two first prizes in piano playing

Education
From the very beginning, Hell's piano teacher has been Prof. Siegbert Panzer, German State Academy of Music, Mannheim.
Felix has been formally educated by Eckard Mayer, at the Hochschule für Kirchenmusik Heidelberg, with Johannes Michel focusing on organ literature, and Christiane Michel focusing on improvisation. In this period of his education, he received additional training courses from professors Martin Lücker, Frankfurt; Pieter van Dijk, Amsterdam; Oleg Yantchenko, Moscow; Wolfgang Rübsam, Chicago; Leo Krämer, Speyer; Franz Lehrndorfer, Munich; Robert Griffith, Delaware/Ohio.

In September 1999, Hell enrolled at the Juilliard School, New York, where he had been awarded a merit-based full tuition scholarship, studying organ with Matthew Lewis and piano with Frank Levy. From 2001 to 2004 Hell studied, again under full tuition scholarship, at The Curtis Institute of Music in Philadelphia, where he graduated in May 2004. Additional coaching while studying at Curtis by Martin Jean (Yale University), Donald Sutherland (Peabody Conservatory) and Marie-Claire Alain, Paris. He  has also studied extensively with Dr. John Weaver at Juilliard, whom he expressed particular gratitude to during a performance at Trinity Church Wall Street in New York. He then played one of Weaver's own compositions.

In September 2004, Hell enrolled in both the Master of Music and the Artist Diploma programs at the Peabody Institute of the Johns Hopkins University in Baltimore, USA, studying under the guidance of Donald Sutherland, attending additional courses held by Joan Lippincott, Princeton University, and Gillian Weir, London. He has since graduated with both degrees.  Hell is currently the resident organist at Lutheran Theological Seminary in Gettysburg, Pennsylvania, as well as a professor of organ at nearby Gettysburg College.  He also continues to concertize extensively.  Besides his native German, Hell speaks perfect and unaccented English.  His name, in German, means "bright", and he expressed amusement in the above-mentioned concert at Trinity Wall Street about finding out what his name meant in English when first coming to America.  He went on to say that his dream is to someday found a conservatory for organ students, where the graduates will be able to say that they "got their degree from Hell".

Performance schedule
Hell maintains a rigorous schedule comprising performances all across the globe. While in Germany, he averages approximately seven performances/recitals per month, and while in the United States, about 12.

Hell has performed more than 650 recitals in Germany and abroad: Canada, Australia, New Zealand, Singapore, Korea, Spain, France, Italy, Russia, Latvia, Iceland, Norway, Jamaica, and the United States, where he has given more than 350 concerts in 42 states.

Discography

Felix Hell 1
Grandes Orgues Th. Kuhn, St. Justinus, Frankfurt a. M.-Höchst

Orgelgiganten
Great Schantz Organ, Cathedral Basilica of the Sacred Heart, Newark, New Jersey, USA

Felix Hell 2
Grandes Orgues Klais, Saint Peter's Church, New York City

Felix Hell - live in concert
Great Schantz Organ, Cathedral Basilica of the Sacred Heart, Newark, New Jersey, USA 
Bach, Pachelbel, Bruhns, Karg-Elert, Mendelssohn, Rheinberger

Organ Sensation
Schoenstein-Organ at First-Plymouth Congregational Church, Lincoln, Nebraska, USA 
Liszt, Vierne, Guilmant, Rheinberger

Mendelssohn at Methuen
Walcker Organ, Op. 200, Methuen Memorial Music Hall, Methuen, Massachusetts, USA

Felix Hell Plays the RIEGER-KLOSS Organ
The Rieger-Kloss Organ, Independent Presbyterian Church, Savannah, Georgia, USA

Notable performance venues

Passau Cathedral (Hoher Dom zu Passau), Germany
Ulm Minster (Ulmer Münster), Germany
Cathedral of Hildesheim (Hoher Dom zu Hildesheim), Germany
Cathedral of St. Mauritius and St. Katharina, Magdeburg, Germany
Cathedral of St. Peter, Worms, Germany
University of Bochum, Auditorium Maximum, Germany
Cathedral of St. John the Divine, New York
National Cathedral of SS. Peter and Paul, Washington D.C.
Basilica of the National Shrine of the Immaculate Conception, Washington D.C.
First Congregational Church, Los Angeles
Broadway Baptist Church, Ft. Worth, Texas
Spivey Hall, Morrow (Atlanta), Georgia
Spreckels Organ at Balboa Park, San Diego
Lincoln Center of the Performing Arts (Alice Tully Hall), New York
Boston Symphony Hall, Boston, Massachusetts
Methuen Memorial Music Hall, Methuen, Massachusetts
Salt Lake Tabernacle, Salt Lake City, Utah
Kotzschmar Memorial Organ, Portland, Maine
Irvine Auditorium, University of Pennsylvania
Wanamaker Organ, Philadelphia
Tschaikovskiy Concert Hall, St. Petersburg
Great Philharmonic Hall, St. Petersburg, Russia
Dome Cathedral, Riga, Latvia
Melbourne Town Hall, Australia
Sydney Opera House, Australia
Sydney Townhall, Australia
Adelaide Town Hall, Australia
Nidaros Cathedral, Trondheim, Norway
Bergen Cathedral, Norway

References

External links
   BACH & friends Documentary 

1985 births
Living people
German classical organists
German male organists
21st-century organists
21st-century German male musicians
Male classical organists